The Telmac TMC-600 was a Finnish microcomputer introduced in 1982 by Telercas Oy, the Finnish importer of RCA microchips. Only 600 units were produced, making it very rare today. The TMC-600 was the only commercially available BASIC-based home computer designed and manufactured in Finland.

Specifications
 RCA 1802A (COSMAC) microprocessor CPU @ 3,58 MHz
 Cassette tape interface
 9 kB RAM, expandable to 30 kB
 80×72 pixels graphical display resolution 
 24 lines by 40 character display resolution
 1-channel
 Telercas SBASIC
 Ports: TV RF, Video (DIN-5), Cassette (DIN-5), Centronics, expansion

References

 Käsikirja TMT-126, TELMAC TMC-600 TIETOKONE

External links
Pelikonepeijoonit - Telmac TMC-600 page
Old Computer and Game Consoles Finland - Telmac TMC-600 page
Emma 02 including TMC-600 Emulator

See also
Telmac 1800

Early microcomputers
8-bit computers

fi:Telmac